Beacon Head is a small headland at the north side of the entrance to Lystad Bay on Horseshoe Island, off Graham Land. It was so named by the UK Antarctic Place-Names Committee because a timber beacon built on the headland by Argentines was used during the survey on Horseshoe Island by the Falkland Islands Dependencies Survey in 1955–57.

References
 

Headlands of Graham Land
Fallières Coast